Manbar is a village in Hulasu Rural District, in the Central District of Shahin Dezh County, West Azerbaijan Province, Iran. At the 2006 census, its population was 625, in 122 families.

References 

Populated places in Shahin Dezh County